People named Haryanto:

  (born 1978), an international-award-winning Indonesian documentary filmmaker
 Rio Haryanto (born 1993), Indonesian racing driver
 Trikus Haryanto, known as Tri Kusharjanto, Indonesian badminton player
 Halim Haryanto (born 1976), Indonesian badminton player
 Kenas Adi Haryanto (born 1993)
 Haryanto Prasetyo (born 1978)

See also 

 Harianto (born 1977), Indonesian footballer